is a Japanese freelance voice actress who worked for Office CHK.

Filmography
Yukiko Hirohara in 11eyes
Poyomon in Digimon Adventure 02
Satomi Arimoto in Fruits Basket
Uribo in Himawari!
Sakuya in Izumo: Takeki Tsurugi no Senki
Marina Koizumi and Miho Maruyama in Ojamajo Doremi series
Nelp and Loveran in Pretty Cure
Aya Hoshino in Super GALS! Kotobuki Ran
Chiyo and Chinatsu in Swing Out Sisters
Natsume Sorayama in Sora no Iro, Mizu no Iro (OVA 1)
Rin Asakura in The World of Narue
Ibuki Shikimori in Happiness!
Angelina Nanatsu Sewell in Mashiroiro Symphony
Starship Ezekiel (aka. "Ell") in My Girlfriend is the President
Asuka Tooyama, Natsuki Mitobe  and Yuki Koyomi in Honoo no Haramase Doukyuusei
Minamo Shiosaki in Love Death 2, 3 and FINAL!

External links
Oma Ichimura Official Site (Japanese)
 
Oma Ichimura at Ryu's Seiyuu Info

1977 births
Japanese voice actresses
Living people
People from Kanagawa Prefecture